National Mining Museum may refer to museums in a variety of countries, including:
 Big Pit National Coal Museum (Originally the National Mining Museum of Wales)
 National Coal Mining Museum for England
 National Mining Museum Scotland
 National Mining Museum, Luxembourg
 National Mining Museum, Zimbabwe